The 2016 Sam Houston State Bearkats football team represented Sam Houston State University in the 2016 NCAA Division I FCS football season. The Bearkats were led by third-year head coach K. C. Keeler and played their home games at Bowers Stadium. They were a member of the Southland Conference. They finished the season 12–1 overall and 9–0 in Southland play to win the Southland Conference title. They went undefeated during the regular season with a record of 11–0. They received the Southland's automatic bid to the FCS Playoffs where they defeated Chattanooga the second round, only to lose in the quarterfinals to James Madison.

Previous season
The Bearkats finished the season 11–4, 7–2 in Southland play to finish in a tie for 2nd place. They received an at-large bid to the FCS Playoffs where they defeated Southern Utah, McNeese State, and Colgate to advance to the Semifinals where they lost to Jacksonville State.

Schedule

Source:

Game summaries

Oklahoma Panhandle State

Sources:

@ Lamar

Sources:

@ Houston Baptist

Sources:

Stephen F. Austin

Sources:

@ Incarnate Word

Sources: Box Score

Abilene Christian

Sources:

@ Nicholls

Sources:

Texas Southern

Sources:

McNeese State

Sources:

@ Northwestern State

Sources:

Central Arkansas

Sources:

FCS Playoffs

Second Round–Chattanooga

Sources:

Quarterfinals–James Madison

Sources:

Ranking movements

References

Sam Houston State
Sam Houston Bearkats football seasons
Southland Conference football champion seasons
Sam Houston State
Sam Houston State Bearkats football